is a 2012 action-adventure platform game for the Nintendo 3DS created by Japanese studio Silver Star.

Plot

The player character is Latis, a dhampir who enters a castle, which has mysteriously appeared in the human world, to defeat its vampire overlord.

Gameplay

Bloody Vampire is a side-scrolling action-adventure game in which the player controls Latis as she finds her way through a vast, maze-like castle. She fights enemies in similar fashion to Hydlide or Ys, bumping into enemies with her body and either inflicting or taking damage depending on her strength and position. She will collect coins by defeating enemies that can then be used to buy equipment from shops. In order to progress deeper into the castle, she will need to acquire certain special items that grant her new abilities and allow her to traverse obstacles.

Reception

Bloody Vampire holds a rating of 65/100 on review aggregate site Metacritic, indicating "mixed or average reviews". Nintendo Life said, "Bloody Vampire is a bit rough around the edges, and it's far from original, but it combines its sleeve-borne influences into a stylised package that's a lot of fun"; however, it expressed reservation over the "designated save spots and the absence of a map". Pocket Gamer said, "Bloody Vampire has the potential to be great, but it's far too sketchy to properly enjoy", criticizing the lack of feedback in the combat system, the lack of a map, and the "under-developed" inventory system.

References

External links
 

2012 video games
Action-adventure games
Agetec games
Metroidvania games
Nintendo 3DS games
Nintendo 3DS-only games
Platform games
Single-player video games
Video games about vampires
Video games developed in Japan
Video games featuring female protagonists
Video games set in castles